Dresden University may refer to:
TU Dresden (Technische Universität Dresden), Dresden, Germany, one of the 10 largest universities in Germany, founded 1828
Dresden International University, partner to Dresden University of Technology which serves Chinese and other international students, in Dresden, since 2003
Dresden University of Applied Sciences (Hochschule für Technik und Wirtschaft Dresden), founded 1992, second largest post-secondary school in Dresden

See also
School of International Studies of the Dresden University of Technology
Dresden Academy of Fine Arts